Thueringoedischiidae is an extinct family of long-horned Orthoptera. There are at least three genera and three described species in Thueringoedischiidae.

Genera
These three genera belong to the family Thueringoedischiidae:
 † Hymenelcana Gorochov, 2004
 † Permoedischia Kukalova, 1955
 † Thueringoedischia Zessin, 1997

References

Ensifera
Prehistoric insect families